Heun is a German surname. Notable people with the surname include:
Conor Heun (born 1979), American mixed martial artist
 Carl Heun, (1771–1854), German author, better known by his pseudonym Heinrich Clauren
Dirk Heun (born 1953), German footballer
Dustin Heun (born 1984), German footballer
Jürgen Heun (born 1958), East German footballer
Karl Heun (1859–1929), German mathematician
Wilhelm Heun (1895–1986), German Wehrmacht general

See also
Heun, Nebraska

German-language surnames